The Frog Kingdom (Chinese: 青蛙王国) is a 2013 Chinese animated adventure drama film directed by Nelson Shin. 
A United States dub of the film was  released on video on demand and on DVD in the United States on June 30, 2015 by Lionsgate and Grindstone Entertainment Group.

Plot
When The Frog King announces that the winner of the annual Froglympics will win his daughter's hand in marriage, she runs away instead. Disguised as a commoner, Princess Froglegs befriends street vendor, Freddie  and begins training with him for the games—determined that she will win and thwart her father's plans of marriage. Meanwhile, the villainous serpent has ideas of his own to ruin the Froglympics and take over the kingdom. With a little luck, and a little help from their trusty sidekicks Bestie and Boogie, Freddie and Princess Froglegs set out to save Frog Kingdom from the evil serpent.

Characters
 Bella Thorne as Geake (Princess Froglegs) - The Princess of the kingdom. She recently disguise herself as a man with a mustache and wears a cap of her head to cover her flower, to sneak out with her maid and best friend and the competition.
 Cameron Dallas as Raindrop (Freddy) - A traveling hermit along with his tadpole friend. He joins the competition and becomes partners with Geake, unaware that she's a girl and the princess. He serves as Geake's love interest.
 Rob Schneider as One Eye
 Drake Bell as Announcer
 Keith David as King

Release
The film was released in China on December 28, 2013. An English dub of the film featuring Cameron Dallas, Bella Thorne and Drake Bell was released in the United States on June 30, 2015 on DVD and through video on demand by Lionsgate.

Sequel
A sequel Arctic Adventure: On Frozen Pond was released in theaters on February 19, 2016 in China and on March 18, 2017 in North America for streaming. The English dub of the sequel featured Anthony Padilla in the lead role of Freddy.

Reception
As of January 5, 2014, the film has grossed US$2.58 million in China.

References

External links
 
 

2013 animated films
2013 films
Animated adventure films
Animated drama films
Animated films about frogs
Chinese animated films
Films directed by Nelson Shin